Between 1809 and 1917 Finland was an autonomous part of the Russian Empire as the Grand Duchy of Finland. Between 1881 and 1901 the Grand Duchy had its own army. Before that several other military units had also been formed.

The Grand Duchy inherited its allotment system (Finnish: ruotujakolaitos, Swedish: indelningsverket) from the Swedish military organization. However, for several decades, Russian rulers did not require military service from Finland – operations and defence were mostly taken care by Russian troops based in the Grand Duchy. As a result, officer benefits of the allotment system became practically pensions, as payment was based on passive availability, not on actual service.

The Diet of Finland made a pact with Tsar Alexander I; Finland paid a tax to Russia as compensation and military service was not called. This lasted until the Crimean War, 1854, during and after which Finland set up some sharpshooter battalions based on rote system.

Napoleonic wars 
In March 1810, Tsar Alexander I ordered the dissolution for 50 years of the Finnish units that had been part of the Swedish Army. At the same time, the allotment system remained as the basis of Finnish military organization. As a result of Alexander's order, enlisted men were not drafted, but officers, non-commissioned officers and military officials retained their previous benefits. A Senate military affairs committee was set up in 1809 to handle all matters pertaining to the allotment system.

Upon Napoleon's invasion of Russia in 1812, the Minister State Secretary of Finland in St. Petersburg, count Gustaf Mauritz Armfelt, advocated for a recruited force of 2,400 light Jäger, who would operate on skis in the winter. Essentially in accordance with Armfelt's proposals, Tsar Alexander on 16 September 1812 ordered the establishment of three Jäger regiments, each with a strength of 1,200 men. The recruits were supposed to be volunteers, but already by early October 1812, vagabonds and men without legal protection were being impressed into service in the regiments. The mission of these forces was to defend Finland, but they could also be sent to defend other Baltic areas.

As was typical for the era, military training was a matter of formality, with the Viipuri Jäger Regiment only receiving gunpowder and cartridges after pulling security duty in St. Petersburg for two months. Only then were the men trained to load and fire their rifles. Three firing exercises were held annually and each time the men would shoot four times from a distance of 80 paces (61 meters). None of the regiments took part in any combat. All were disbanded in 1830.

A training battalion formed in 1827 was renamed Lifgardets Finska Skarpskytte-Batallion (Henkikaartin Suomen Tarkk'ampujapataljoona in Finnish, Guards Sharpshooter battalion) which was more commonly known as the Guard of Finland (Suomen kaarti, Finska Gardet). It remained as a unit of the Russian Imperial Guard until 1905 when it was disbanded. The Cadet school in Hamina was founded in 1812 and existed until 1903. A Finska Grenadier Skarpskytte Batallion (Suomen Krenatööritarkk'ampujapataljoona, Grenadier Sharpshooter Battalion) was founded in 1846, but later disbanded in 1860.

A Navy unit, Första Finska Sjö-Equipaget in Swedish, Suomen Meriekipaasi in Finnish was founded in 1830. It had up to 1000 men and officers.
The ships were mostly small sailing vessels, but also comprised a couple of bigger steam frigates, the Rurik and the Kalevala, named after the Finnish national epic.  Andra Finska Sjö-Equipaget, 2. Meriekipaasi was founded during the Åland War, part of the Crimean War. Finnish Navy artillery-men fought against the British and French fleets from the Santahamina island shore batteries during the siege of Fortress Sveaborg in Helsinki.

Meriekipaasi's number of men was greatly reduced during the 1860s and −70's and finally the unit was disbanded in the 1880s.

The Meriekipaasi personnel were housed in a garrison building in Katajanokka called Merikasarmi, (Marinkasernen in Swedish) in Helsinki. Today, the building houses the Foreign Ministry.

Crimean war 
During the Crimean War nine battalions were formed in Finland. The soldiers were drafted using the allotment system, a remnant from the Swedish time. The battalions were disbanded in 1867.

The conscription act of 1878 

During the 1860s conscription was seen as an effective way to maintain an army. In 1878 a law was passed by the Finnish Landtag and the Emperor Alexander II calling for a general conscription in Finland. The result was an army that was separated from the Russian army. The army was to consist of only Finnish citizens and was to be led by the Governor-General of Finland. The maximum number of men in the army was set to 5600 and it was to consist of:

 Henkivartioväen 3. Tarkk'ampujapataljoona (Helsinki) / Лейб-гвардии 3-й стрелковый Финский батальон (г. Гельсингфорс)
 Suomen 1. Uudenmaan Tarkk'ampujapataljoona (Helsinki) / 1-й Нюландский финский стрелковый батальон (г. Гельсингфорс)
 Suomen 2. Turun Tarkk'ampujapataljoona (Turku) / 2-й Абоский финский стрелковый батальон (г. Або)
 Suomen 3. Vaasan Tarkk'ampujapataljoona (Vaasa) / 3-й Вазаский финский стрелковый батальон (г. Николайстад)
 Suomen 4. Oulun Tarkk'ampujapataljoona (Oulu) / 4-й Улеаборгский финский стрелковый батальон (г. Улеаборг)
 Suomen 5. Kuopion Tarkk'ampujapataljoona (Kuopio) / 5-й Куопиоский финский стрелковый батальон (г. Куопио)
 Suomen 6. Mikkelin Tarkk'ampujapataljoona (Mikkeli) / 6-й Санкт-Михельский финский стрелковый батальон (г. Санкт-Михель)
 Suomen 7. Hämeenlinnan Tarkk'ampujapataljoona (Hämeenlinna) / 7-й Тавастгусский финский стрелковый батальон (г. Тавастгус)
 Suomen 8. Viipurin Tarkk'ampujapataljoona (Viipuri) / 8-й Выборгский финский стрелковый батальон (г. Выборг)
 Suomen Rakuunarykmentti (Lappeenranta) (1890) / Финский драгунский полк (г. Вильманстранд)
 Suomen Kadettikoulu (Hamina) / Финский кадетский корпус (г. Фридрихсгам)

Organisation 
The battalions were founded in 1880–1881 and reached full strength in 1883. Each infantry battalion consisted of four companies. The Dragoon Regiment (Rakuunarykmentti, Dragonregemente) consisted of six squadrons (eskadroona). Thirty-two reserve companies were formed in 1883. The conscripts were selected by a lottery. For those selected to serve, the period of service was three years. However, those with a comprehensive education (at least 4 years at school) had a service period of two years. The conscripts who were university students served only a year. Those not selected to serve the full period served one month each summer for three years in the reserve company of their region.

Uniforms 
All Finnish line units wore the dark green uniforms of the Imperial Russian infantry and dragoons but with light blue facings as a distinction. The Guards Sharpshooters' Battalion wore yellow facings on its dark green uniform, until it was disbanded in 1905.

Disbandment 
Between 1901 and 1905 the separate Finnish army battalions underwent a series of disbandments, concluding with that of the Guards Sharpshooters' Battalion. This was part of the political "oppression years" which saw a downgrading of the autonomous status of the Grand Duchy within the Russian Empire.

The original intention was that Finnish recruits would continue to serve but in regular Russian units of the Imperial Army stationed elsewhere. This however met with widespread opposition, with under half of the conscripts called for service in 1902 reporting for training. Accordingly conscription in Finland was terminated in 1905. A special tax was substituted; to be paid from the Finnish Senate to the Imperial treasury.

See also 
 Finland Guard Regiment
 Finnish Rifle Battalion
 Finnish Defence Forces
 Finnish Army
 Finnish Army (1939)

References

Sources 
 
 J.E.O. Screen, Suomalaiset tarkk'ampujat - Suomen vanha sotaväki 1881 - 1901
 J.E.O. Screen, The Finnish Army, 1881 - 1901 - Training the Rifle Battalions

External links
 Social relations and cultural categorisation in the memoirs of Finnish guardsmen taking part in the Russo-Turkish war, 1877–1878
 Finland officers in Bulgarian army after the end of Russian Turkish war in 1877 – 1878.
 Uudenmaan tarkk'ampujapataljoonan upseerit asuivat Karhun korttelissa Helsingin Sanomat (in Finnish)
 Finlands Stats-Kalender för Skottåret 1840 – Lif-Gardets Finska Skarpskytte-Bataillon. (in Swedish)

Grand Duchy of Finland
Military history of Finland